Multi-National Division may refer to:

Bosnia
Multi-National Division (North) (c.1996-1999)
Multi-National Division (South-East) (c.1996-1999)
Multi-National Division (South-West) (c.1996-1999)
Iraq
Multi-National Division - Baghdad  (c.2003-2011)
Multinational Division Central  (c.2003-2009)
Multinational Division Central-South  (c.2003-2008)
Multi-National Division (North)  (c.2003-2011)
Multi-National Division (South)  (c.2009-2011) (formed by the merger in 2009 of Multi-National Division (Center) and Multi-National Division (South East))
Multi-National Division (South-East)   (c.2003-2009)

NATO
Multinational Division Southeast (NATO) (established in Romania 2015)
Multinational Division North East (NATO) (established in Poland 2017)
Multinational Division North (NATO) (established in Latvia 2019)